The following is an alphabetical list of articles related to the United States Territory of American Samoa.

0–9

.as – Internet country code top-level domain for American Samoa

A
Administrative divisions of American Samoa
Airports in American Samoa
American Samoa  (website)
:Category:American Samoa
commons:Category:American Samoa
American Samoa Territorial Police
AS – United States Postal Service postal code for the Territory of American Samoa
Atlas of American Samoa
Aunu‘u Island

B
Birds of American Samoa

C
Capital of American Samoa
Colleges and universities in American Samoa
commons:Category:Universities and colleges in American Samoa
Communications in American Samoa
:Category:Communications in American Samoa
commons:Category:Communications in American Samoa
Constitution of American Samoa
Culture of Samoa
:Category:American Samoan culture
commons:Category:American Samoan culture
Cyclones in American Samoa

D
Demographics of American Samoa

E
Economy of American Samoa
:Category:Economy of American Samoa
commons:Category:Economy of American Samoa
Education in American Samoa
commons:Category:Education in American Samoa
Elections in American Samoa
:Category:Elections in American Samoa
Electoral reform in American Samoa
Environment of American Samoa
commons:Category:Environment of American Samoa

F

Fa'asamoa
Fagatogo, American Samoa, capital since 1967
Flag of American Samoa

G
Geography of American Samoa
:Category:Geography of American Samoa
commons:Category:Geography of American Samoa
Geology of American Samoa
Government of the Territory of American Samoa  (website)
:Category:Government of American Samoa
commons:Category:Government of American Samoa
Governor of the Territory of American Samoa
List of governors of American Samoa

H
Higher education in American Samoa
History of American Samoa
Historical outline of American Samoa
:Category:History of American Samoa
commons:Category:History of American Samoa

I
Images of American Samoa
Independent State of Samoa
Official protest to the Independent State of Samoa
Islands of American Samoa
Aunu‘u Island
Ofu Island
Olosega Island
Rose Atoll
Swains Island
Ta‘ū Island
Tutuila Island

L
Languages of American Samoa
Law enforcement in American Samoa
Lists related to American Samoa:
List of airports in American Samoa
List of American Samoa locations by per capita income
List of American Samoa territorial symbols
List of birds of American Samoa
List of cities in American Samoa
List of colleges and universities in American Samoa
List of Delegates to the United States House of Representatives from American Samoa
List of governors of American Samoa
List of islands of American Samoa
List of mammals of American Samoa
List of National Natural Landmarks in American Samoa
List of political parties in American Samoa
List of radio stations in American Samoa
List of Registered Historic Places in American Samoa
List of reptiles of American Samoa
List of Superfund sites in American Samoa
List of the wettest known tropical cyclones in American Samoa

M
Mammals of American Samoa
Military in American Samoa
Mountains of American Samoa
commons:Category:Mountains of American Samoa
Music of American Samoa

N
National Park of American Samoa

O
Ofu Island
Olosega Island

P
Pacific Basin Development Council
Pago Pago, American Samoa, capital 1899–1967
People from American Samoa
Politics of American Samoa
List of political parties in American Samoa
:Category:Politics of American Samoa
commons:Category:Politics of American Samoa
Protected areas of American Samoa
commons:Category:Protected areas of American Samoa

R
Radio stations in American Samoa
Registered historic places in American Samoa
commons:Category:Registered Historic Places in American Samoa
Religion in American Samoa
commons:Category:Religion in American Samoa
Reptiles of American Samoa
Rose Atoll

S

Samoan Islands
Samoans
Scouting in American Samoa
Seal of American Samoa
:Category:Society of American Samoa
commons:Category:American Samoan society
Sports in American Samoa
Football Federation American Samoa
:Category:Sports in American Samoa
commons:Category:Sports in American Samoa
Superfund sites in American Samoa
Swains Island

T
Ta‘ū Island
Telecommunications in American Samoa
commons:Category:Communications in American Samoa
Television stations in American Samoa
Territory of American Samoa  (website)
Constitution of American Samoa
Government of American Samoa
:Category:Government of American Samoa
commons:Category:Government of American Samoa
Administrative divisions of American Samoa
List of governors of American Samoa
Tokelau
Territorial claim by Tokelau nationalists
Tourism in American Samoa  (website)
commons:Category:Tourism in American Samoa
Transportation in American Samoa
Tutuila Island

U
United States of America
List of Delegates to the United States House of Representatives from American Samoa
Political divisions of the United States
United States Court of Appeals for the Ninth Circuit
American Samoa's At-large congressional district
Universities and colleges in American Samoa
commons:Category:Universities and colleges in American Samoa

W
Wikimedia
Wikimedia Commons Atlas of American Samoa
Wikimedia Commons Category:American Samoa
commons:Category:Maps of American Samoa
Wikinews:Category:American Samoa
Wikinews:Portal:American Samoa
Wikipedia Category:American Samoa

Wikipedia:WikiProject American Samoa
Wikipedia:WikiProject American Samoa#Recognized content
Wikipedia:WikiProject American Samoa#Participants
Wikipedia:WikiProject Lists of basic topics/Draft/List of basic American Samoa topics

See also

Topic overview:
American Samoa
Outline of American Samoa

Bibliography of American Samoa

 
American Samoa